WTTL-FM (106.9 FM) is a radio station licensed to serve Madisonville, Kentucky, United States. The station is licensed to Madisonville CBC, Inc. and owned by Commonwealth Broadcasting Corporation. It airs an adult contemporary format.

The station has been assigned these call letters by the Federal Communications Commission since December 26, 2011.

Shows & Personalities
Coffee with Craig 6am-noon weekdays

Boyce Tate provides local news, weekdays 6-9 AM, 12 Noon, and at 5 PM.

WTTL-FM is the sports voice of Hopkins County Central High School.

References

External links
WTTL-FM web site

TTL-FM
Mainstream adult contemporary radio stations in the United States